Mandalgarh railway station is a railway station in Bhilwara district, Rajasthan. Its code is MLGH. It serves Mandalgarh town. The station consists of a single platform. Passenger, Express and Superfast trains halt here.

References

Railway stations in Bhilwara district
Kota railway division